Wen Jiabao (born 2 January 1999) is a Chinese professional footballer who currently plays for Chinese Super League club Shanghai Shenhua.

Club career
Wen Jiabao joined Chinese Super League club Guangzhou Evergrande from Dalian Aerbin on 29 January 2016 on a free transfer. On 30 August 2016, Dalian Aerbin (now known as Dalian Yifang) would claim that they still had a valid contract with Wen Jiabao and that Guangzhou Evergrande acted fraudulently. The contract dispute would be settled and Wen was promoted to Guangzhou Evergrande's first team squad in time for the start of the 2017 Chinese Super League season. He made his senior debut on 8 August 2017 in a 2–2 home draw against city rivals Guangzhou R&F as the benefactor of the new rule of the league that at least one Under-23 player must be in the starting line-up. He was substituted off by Zheng Long in the 20th minute. After playing several further games Wen was demoted to the reserve squad in the 2018 season.

On 7 February 2019, Wen was loaned to fellow first-tier club Tianjin Tianhai for the 2019 season. He would go on to make his debut for the club on 31 March 2019 against Shandong Luneng Taishan F.C. in a league game that ended in a 4-2 defeat. The following season Wen would join another top tier club in Shanghai Shenhua on 6 January 2020 on a permanent basis. He would make his debut against his old club Guangzhou Evergrande on 25 July 2020 in a league game that ended in a 2-0 defeat.

International career
On 20 July 2022, Wen made his international debut in a 3-0 defeat against South Korea in the 2022 EAFF E-1 Football Championship, as the Chinese FA decided to field the U-23 national team for this senior competition.

Career statistics
.

Honours

Club
Guangzhou Evergrande
Chinese Super League: 2017

References

External links
 

1999 births
Living people
Chinese footballers
Footballers from Liaoning
Sportspeople from Liaoyang
Association football defenders
Chinese Super League players
Guangzhou F.C. players
Tianjin Tianhai F.C. players
Shanghai Shenhua F.C. players
China under-20 international footballers